Viktor Yosifov (born 16 October 1985) is a Bulgarian volleyball player. He is a member of the Bulgaria men's national volleyball team. Yosifov is a bronze medallist of the 2009 European Championship.

Sporting achievements

Clubs
 CEV Challenge Cup
  2018/2019 – with Vero Volley Monza

 National championships 
 2013/2014  German Cup, with VfB Friedrichshafen
 2013/2014  German Championship, with VfB Friedrichshafen

Individual awards
 2009: CEV European Championship – Best Blocker
 2013: Italian Championship – Best Blocker
 2015: CEV European Championship – Best Middle Blocker
 2016: Italian Championship – Best Blocker
 2018: Italian Championship – Best Blocker
 2020: CEV Olympic Qualification – Best Middle Blocker

External links
 Player profile at CEV.eu
 Player profile at PlusLiga.pl
 Player profile at LegaVolley.it
 Player profile at Volleybox.net

References

1985 births
Living people
Bulgarian men's volleyball players
Olympic volleyball players of Bulgaria
Volleyball players at the 2012 Summer Olympics
Bulgarian expatriate sportspeople in Italy
Expatriate volleyball players in Italy
Bulgarian expatriate sportspeople in Germany
Expatriate volleyball players in Germany
Bulgarian expatriate sportspeople in Russia
Expatriate volleyball players in Russia
Bulgarian expatriate sportspeople in Poland
Expatriate volleyball players in Poland
Modena Volley players
Czarni Radom players